John Stuart Evans (born June 13, 1964) is a former American football tight end who played for the Atlanta Falcons of the National Football League (NFL). He played college football at Stephen F. Austin University.

References 

Living people
1964 births
American football tight ends
Stephen F. Austin Lumberjacks football players
Atlanta Falcons players